Kabylophytoecia is a monotypic beetle genus in the family Cerambycidae described by Sama in 2005. Its only species, Kabylophytoecia cirteensis, was described by Hippolyte Lucas in 1842.

References

Saperdini
Beetles described in 1842
Monotypic beetle genera